The Moscow Philharmonic Orchestra is an orchestra based in Moscow, Russia.  It was founded in 1951 by Samuil Samosud, as the Moscow Youth Orchestra for young and inexperienced musicians, acquiring its current name in 1953.  It is most associated with longtime conductor Kiril Kondrashin under whom it premiered Shostakovich's Fourth and Thirteenth symphonies as well as other works. The Orchestra undertook a major tour of Japan with Kondrashin in April 1967 and CDs of the Japanese radio recordings have been made available on the Altus label.

The orchestra has also flourished under Yuri Simonov, the orchestra's principal conductor since 1998. In recent years it has performed in Britain, France, Germany, Slovenia, Croatia, Poland, Lithuania, and Spain, as well as Hong Kong, Japan and South Korea.

They also have collaborated with composers Igor Stravinsky, Benjamin Britten and Krzysztof Penderecki.

Music directors
Samuil Samosud (1951–1957)
Nathan Rachlin (1957–1960)
Kirill Kondrashin (1960–1975)
Dmitri Kitaenko (1976–1990)
Vassily Sinaisky (1991–1996)
Mark Ermler (1996–1998)
Yuri Simonov (1998–)

Discography 
A to Z of Conductors: Naxos Educational    8.558087-90 Ballet, Orchestral, Choral - Sacred MYASKOVSKY: Symphonies Nos. 24 and 25 Naxos 8.555376
Pavlova: Monolog / The Old New York Nostalgia / Sulamith (Suite) Naxos 8.557674 
Shostakovich: Symphony No. 7, "Leningrad" BIS BIS-CD-515 
Tishchenko: Symphony No. 7, Op. 119 Naxos 8.557013 
Xenakis: Dox-Orkh / Mira Fornes: Desde Tan Tien BIS BIS-CD-772

See also 
 Russian Philharmonic Orchestra
 National Philharmonic of Russia

References
Notes

External links
Page about the history of the orchestra from Philharmonia.spb.ru, accessed 18 June 2013
Moscow Philharmonic hoax

Musical groups established in 1951
Russian symphony orchestras
1951 establishments in the Soviet Union